Nouman Ali Khan is a Pakistani-American Islamic speaker and Arabic instructor who founded the Bayyinah Institute for Arabic and Qur’anic Studies after serving as an instructor of Arabic at Nassau Community College. He has been named one of the 500 most influential Muslims in the world by the Royal Islamic Strategic Studies Centre of Jordan.

Early life
Khan was born 4 May 1978, in Germany to a Pakistani family and spent his preschool years in the former East Berlin. His father then worked for the Pakistan Embassy in Riyadh, Saudi Arabia, where Khan attended the Pakistan Embassy school from grades 2 to 8. His father moved the family to New York when Khan was in his teens.

Career

Controversies
In September 2017, Khan was involved in a sexting scandal and accused of spiritual abuse and "luring women into sexual relationships disguised as secret marriages". Khan responded that the leaked text conversations were "between consenting adults" and that the women were marriage prospects, noting that he had been divorced for two years. 

Six eminent Muslim clerics and academics, led by imam Mohamed Magid, began their own inquiry into the allegations and released a joint statement, asserting that Khan "had engaged in conduct unbecoming of any believer, much less someone who teaches about the Holy Qur’an." Khan had attempted to prevent the release of the statement. 

Some women who spoke out against Khan faced significant backlash.

Publications

References

External links

Living people
American Muslims
People from Dallas
20th-century Muslims
21st-century Muslims
21st-century Muslim scholars of Islam
American expatriates in Saudi Arabia
American people of Pakistani descent
1978 births
People from East Berlin
American religious writers
Islamic television preachers